Cryphoeca exlineae is a species of true spider in the family Cybaeidae. It is found in the United States.

References

exlineae
Articles created by Qbugbot
Spiders described in 1988